Ar Log (Welsh for "for hire") are a Welsh folk band. They have performed since the 1970s and are recognized as the first professional Welsh folk band. They perform instrumental music and songs in Welsh.

Career

The original 1976 members were Dave Burns (guitar), Dafydd Roberts (triple harp, flute), Gwyndaf Roberts (knee harp and bass) and Iolo Jones (fiddle). The four individuals were brought together by the Welsh Committee of the Lorient Festival who were eager that a Welsh traditional group should represent the nation at that year's Interceltique festival in Lorient. Here they met The Dubliners, who suggested that they should stay together and turn professional. When they arrived in Brittany they had to think of a name and to reflect their status they called themselves Ar Log which means 'For Hire'. During this period, the group released the first of several eponymous albums: Ar Log.

In 1978 Iolo Jones left, and then in 1979 Dave Burns left. This could have led to the break-up of the group but the group successfully advertised for a new guitarist (Geraint Glynne Davies) and fiddler (Graham Pritchard).

It is notable that Ar Log's members are drawn from across the diverse geographic and cultural regions of Wales - and from differing musical backgrounds. Dafydd and Gwyndaf were brought up in Llwyngwril, Merionethshire in the northwestern heartland of the Welsh language. They were immersed in the tradition of Welsh folk harping by their tutor, Nansi Richards ("Telynores Maldwyn", the harpist of Maldwyn). Nansi subsequently endorsed Ar Log's first album. Iolo Jones is originally from Caerphilly, a former coal mining town in south Wales. Iolo was originally a classically trained fiddler but succeeded in crossing over to the folk genre. Graham Pritchard was also successful in combining, throughout his career, the complex harmonies of Ar Log with the lighter fiddle style employed by Mynediad am Ddim of which he was also a member.

The group's lead singers also provide contrasting styles. The original singer, Dave Burns, is from Cardiff, where one as likely to hear Irish session music as much as Welsh. Burns made the transition between Ar Log and the Hennessys, a south Wales group singing in the English language. In comparison, Geraint Glynne Davies is a Welsh speaker from the north. His main performing influence was the rock group Queen. Geraint played a 'roundback' guitar with a distinctive tinny edge. In the absence of drums or percussion, Geraint's energetic guitar style contributed at least as much to the rhythm as to the harmony of the group.

The quartet of Geraint, Graham, Dafydd and Gwyndaf recorded two albums, Ar Log II and Ar Log III. The former album contains perhaps the best example of the Roberts' brothers harping: "Merch Megan/Wyres Megan" and "Llydaw" are two classic triple harp arrangements. These contrast with sea shanties of J. Glyn Davies ("Fflat Huw Puw" and "Rownd yr Horn").
  
In 1983, Ar Log's horizons expanded substantially with the addition of Stephen ('Steffan') Rees (accordion, fiddle and keyboards). Ar Log's instrumental polymath, Stephen went on to lead an academic career in music. Rees played clarinet on one track ("Ciosg Talysarn"). Pritchard left in 1983.

By this time, Ar Log had become particularly associated with Dafydd Iwan, a long-standing figure in the Welsh national movement. In 1982 and 1983, Ar Log embarked on two tours with Iwan. The first tour 'Taith 700' was to mark the 700th anniversary of the death of Llywelyn ap Gruffudd in 1282. The tours produced two albums (Rhwng Hwyl a Thaith and Yma o Hyd). The synthesiser and accordion of Stephen Rees came to the fore for the first time on these two recordings. On some tracks, the synth would comprise simple, sustained background chords (e.g. "Dail y Teim"). On others, synth would be used to specific effect e.g. harpsichord sound ("Abergeni") or trumpet fanfare ("Yma o Hyd"). The accordion medley on the Yma o Hyd album with its proliferation of triplet notes remains perhaps the most complex set performed on Welsh accordion to date.

In 1983, the group recorded an all-instrumental album, Meillionen (=clover leaf), aimed primarily at the Welsh folk dance community. Dafydd Roberts is a skillful clog-dancer. The sleeve notes of the album also included a booklet of dance steps for the various sets on the album.  Meillionen is the only non-eponymous album in the set.

Ar Log IV was recorded in 1984. Ar Log's ability to convert simple tunes into sophisticated harmonies is demonstrated in tracks such as "Cerrig y Rhyd".

By 1988, Iolo Jones had returned as a second fiddler. Ar Log V probably remains the group's most prominent album in terms of blending the synthesiser into the traditional elements. The group also rejoined Dafydd Iwan in 1988 for a celebration of the singer's quarter-centennial on the road. However, by now, Ar Log had essentially become a part-time operation, as the group's members had found full-time employment elsewhere.

In 1996, Ar Log celebrated their anniversary by recalling all of the group's members, past and present, to record. Ar Log VI.  A book was compiled by Lyn Ebenezer to mark the group's anniversary. An enduring aspect of Ar Log VI was the adoption by Ar Log of a drummer and bassist in some selected concerts. The new style brings Ar Log into a more folk-rock style. Stephen Rees subsequently left the group and became a founder member of Crasdant. Geraint Cynan, a prolific composer and music arranger, joined on keyboards. Ar Log have taken Welsh music to over twenty countries on three continents and were the first professional Welsh traditional folk group. They are still gigging as a seven-piece and, in 2016, they celebrated 40 years with concerts in Wales, Germany and Ireland.

In August 2018, Ar Log released Ar Log VII at The National Eisteddfod in Cardiff - 40 years almost to the day after they released their first album, Ar Log at The National Eisteddfod in 1978. 

In 2004, Dafydd Roberts became Chief Executive of the Welsh record label Sain, which had released several of Ar Log's albums.

References

Welsh-language bands
Welsh folk musicians